Calaphidius elegans is a species of braconid wasps in the subfamily Aphidiinae. It is found in Europe, including Germany, the Czech Republic and Finland.

References 

 Die Gattungen der Familie Aphidiidae und ihre verwandtschaftliche Zuordnung (Hymenoptera: Ichneumonoidea). M Mackauer - Beiträge zur Entomologie, 1961
 Neue europaische Blattlaus-Schlupfwespen (Hymenoptera: Aphidiidae). M. Mackauer, Bollettino del Laboratorio di Entomologia, 1961, Portici. 19, pages 270–290.
 Calaphidius elegans found in Finland (Hymenoptera, Braconiidae: Aphidiinae). M. Koponen and V. Vikberg, Notulae Entomologicae, 1984, volume 64, page 83

External links 

 
 Calaphidius elegans at Biolib.cz
 Calaphidius elegans at Fauna Europaea
 

Braconidae
Hymenoptera of Europe
Insects described in 1961